Lullange is a village in the commune of Wincrange, in northern Luxembourg.  , the village had a population of 124.

Villages in Luxembourg
Wincrange